The United States of Albert is a Canadian, French and Swiss co-produced comedy-drama film, directed by André Forcier and released in 2005. The film stars Éric Bruneau as Albert Renaud, a young actor in Montreal who dreams of becoming a movie star in Hollywood, and sets off on a road trip across the United States in pursuit of his dreams; en route, he meets a variety of characters including Grace Carson (Émilie Dequenne), a young Mormon woman with whom he falls in love, and Jack Decker (Roy Dupuis), a mentally unstable man who takes Albert golfing in the Arizona desert.

The cast also includes Andréa Ferréol, Alex Descas, Marc Labrèche, Geneviève Brouillette and Céline Bonnier.

Brendan Kelly of the Montreal Gazette panned the film, writing that Forcier's decision to cast a mixture of Québécois and European actors resulted in a distracting diversity of accents, and that it strained credulity that the American characters Albert met on his trip would all be able to speak French.

Gilles Aird received a Jutra Award nomination for Best Art Direction at the 8th Jutra Awards in 2006. The film was a Lumières Award nominee for Best French-Language Film at the 12th Lumières Awards in 2007.

References

External links 
 

2005 films
Canadian road comedy-drama films
French road comedy-drama films
Swiss comedy-drama films
Films set in Montreal
Films set in the United States
Films directed by André Forcier
French-language Canadian films
2000s Canadian films
2000s French films